

Royal Consort of Tonga

House of Tupou

Notes

References 

 
Lists of queens
Consorts
Lists of royal consorts